Doctor Who is a British science fiction television programme produced by the BBC.  This includes one television movie and multiple specials, and encompasses  stories over 39 seasons, starting in 1963. Additionally, four charity specials and two animated serials have also been aired. The programme's high episode count has resulted in Doctor Who holding the world record for the highest number of episodes of a science-fiction programme. In May 2017, it was announced that BBC Worldwide sold the right of refusal on future series of the programme until and including series 15 in China.

Doctor Who ceased broadcasting in 1989, then resumed in 2005. The original series (1963–1989), generally consists of multi-episode serials. The 2005 revival trades the earlier serial format for a run of self-contained episodes, interspersed with occasional multi-part stories and structured into loose story arcs.

The story numbers below are meant as a guide to placement in the overall context of the programme. There is some dispute, for instance, about whether to count Season 23's The Trial of a Time Lord as one or as four serials, and whether the unfinished serial Shada should be included. The numbering scheme in this list follows the official website's episode guide. Other sources, such as the Region 1 classic Doctor Who DVD releases, use different numbering schemes, which diverge after the 108th story, The Horns of Nimon (1979–1980).

Series overview
The following table dictates the season or series in question for the programme as a whole.

Regular seasons

Specials

Notes

Episodes

Ninth Doctor
In 2005, the BBC relaunched Doctor Who after a 15-year absence from episodic television, with Russell T Davies, Julie Gardner, and Mal Young as executive producers, Phil Collinson as producer, and Christopher Eccleston taking the lead role of the Ninth Doctor.

The revival is a continuation of the original series. The new series is formatted to a 16:9 widescreen display ratio, and a standard episode length of 45 minutes. For the first time since the 1965–1966 season, each episode has a title, and most stand alone as complete stories. The show also returned to its traditional Saturday evening slot.

Series 1 (2005)

The 2005 series constitutes a loose story arc, dealing with the consequences of the Time War and the mystery of the seemingly omnipresent phrase 'Bad Wolf'.

Tenth Doctor
The Tenth Doctor was portrayed by David Tennant, who was cast before the first series aired.

Series 2 (2006)

The back-story for the spin-off series Torchwood is "seeded" in various episodes in the 2006 series. Each episode also has an accompanying online Tardisode.

Series 3 (2007)

This series introduces Martha Jones and deals with the Face of Boe's final message, the mysterious Mr. Saxon, and the Doctor dealing with the loss of Rose Tyler.

Series 4 (2008)

This series explores the coincidences binding the Doctor and Donna together. There is also the loose story arc of both planets and bees disappearing.

Specials (2008–2010)

The specials focus on the "four knocks" and the death of the Tenth Doctor. From "Planet of the Dead", episodes were filmed in HD.

Eleventh Doctor
The Eleventh Doctor was portrayed by Matt Smith. Steven Moffat took over as showrunner from the fifth series.

Series 5 (2010)

This series deals with cracks spreading throughout time, the Pandorica and the Silence which are mentioned in various episodes.

Series 6 (2011)

The series centres on River Song's relation to the Doctor, the Doctor's "death" and discovering what the Silence is. The original transmission of series 6 was split into two parts, with the first seven episodes airing April to June 2011 and the final six from late August to October 2011.

Series 7 (2012–2013)

Series 7 started with five episodes and a Christmas special in late 2012, followed by eight episodes in 2013. The series dealt with the exit of the Ponds, the Great Intelligence and the mystery of Clara Oswald, the Impossible Girl.

Specials (2013)
The specials focus on various incarnations of the Doctor, including the return of the Tenth Doctor and the reveal of the War Doctor and his actions during the Time War.

Twelfth Doctor
The Twelfth Doctor was portrayed by Peter Capaldi.

Series 8 (2014)

For series 8 to 10, the episode count was reduced from thirteen to twelve. This series dealt with the mystery identity of the character "Missy" and the mystery around "The Promised Land".

Series 9 (2015)

This series dealt with the consequences of the Doctor and Clara's relationship, and the Doctor's confession about the Hybrid.

Series 10 (2017)

This series dealt with the mystery of the vault and the Doctor's oath, later exploring the Doctor and Missy's relationship, and the possibility of Missy "turning good". This season introduces Bill Potts (Pearl Mackie) and Nardole (Matt Lucas) as the Doctor's companions.

Thirteenth Doctor
The Thirteenth Doctor was portrayed by Jodie Whittaker. Chris Chibnall took over as showrunner from the eleventh series.

Series 11 (2018)

For series 11, the episode count was reduced from twelve to ten with each episode's runtime increasing by ten minutes. The Thirteenth Doctor initially searched for her lost TARDIS, inadvertently bringing her companions with her on her travels, who contemplated returning to their lives but decided to continue travelling. The series also dealt with grief, and saw the time slot change to Sunday.

Series 12 (2020)

This series dealt with a new incarnation of the Master, the return of Jack Harkness, the appearance of an unknown incarnation of the Doctor who existed at some point before the Time War, and the "lone Cyberman", while following the destruction of Gallifrey and the secret of the Timeless Child. The special marked the last regular appearance of Graham and Ryan.

Series 13 (2021)

Series 13 consisted of a single story arc, subtitled Flux. The series dealt with a universe-ending anomaly called the "Flux", which brought several enemies together in an attempt to take over Earth. It also featured the Division from Series 12. Dan Lewis (John Bishop) joined the series as a new companion.

Specials (2022)

Series 13 was followed by three specials in 2022. The first was broadcast on New Year's Day, the second on Easter Sunday, and Whittaker's final feature-length special, in which the Thirteenth Doctor regenerated, on 23 October, as part of the BBC's Centenary celebrations. The specials loosely continued from Flux, and dealt with Yaz and the Doctor's relationship.

Fourteenth Doctor
The Fourteenth Doctor is portrayed by David Tennant, who previously portrayed the Tenth Doctor. Russell T Davies is returning as showrunner, partnering with Bad Wolf to celebrate the 60th anniversary and "series beyond".

Specials  

Three hour-long specials will air as part of the 60th anniversary in November 2023.

Fifteenth Doctor
The Fifteenth Doctor will be portrayed by Ncuti Gatwa.

Series 14  

The following eight-episode fourteenth series will screen in 2024. Filming started on 5 December 2022.

See also

 Doctor Who missing episodes
 List of Doctor Who Christmas and New Year's specials
 List of unmade Doctor Who serials and films
 List of Doctor Who audio releases
 List of Doctor Who home video releases
 List of Doctor Who audio plays by Big Finish
 List of Doctor Who radio stories
 List of supplementary Doctor Who episodes
 Doctor Who spin-offs

References

Notes

Citations

General websites

External links
 BBC Classic Series Episode Guide
 BBC Episode Guide (Classic and New Series)
 Doctor Who Reference Guide – detailed descriptions of all televised episodes, plus spin-off audio, video, and literary works.
 Doctor Who at IMDb: 1963–1989, 1996, 2005–

Lists of British science fiction television series episodes
Doctor Who serials
Doctor Who series
2005 to present
Doctor Who, 2005 to present
Doctor Who, 2005 to present